Elections to City of York Council were held on Thursday 5 May 2011.  The whole council was up for election. The vote took place alongside the 2011 United Kingdom Alternative Vote referendum.

The Labour Party gained overall control of the council from no overall control. Labour had previously won a majority of seats on the new York unitary council in 1995 and again in 1999. The Liberal Democrats had controlled the council outright since 2003 and led a minority administration since the 2007 election.

Andrew Waller, leader of the Liberal Democrats group and former leader of the Council, was not reelected. Councillor Carol Runciman became leader of the Liberal Democrats group but stepped down in May 2013 and was replaced by Councillor Keith Aspden.  Councillor Chris Steward became leader of the Conservative group in January 2014, succeeding Councillor Ian Gillies. Councillor James Alexander resigned as leader of the Labour Group and leader of the Council in November 2014, with Councillor Dafydd Williams taking on both of these roles.

In August 2012, Lynn Jeffries, a Labour councillor resigned the whip in protest at the Council's cuts to social care, bringing the number of Independent Councillors to two; she subsequently joined the Liberal Democrat group.
Labour Councillor Brian Watson became an independent councillor in May 2014 after being deselected in Guildhall ward. In September 2014, Councillor Helen Douglas resigned from the Labour group and joined the Conservatives leading to Labour losing overall control of the Council. Councillors Ken King and David Scott resigned from the Labour group in October 2014. One seat was vacant following the death of councillor Lynn Jeffries in August 2014. The subsequent by-election held in October 2014 was won by Liberal Democrat former Council leader Andrew Waller. Conservative councillor Joe Watt left the Conservatives group in January 2015 after falling out with party leader Chris Steward.

Election result

Ward results

Acomb ward

 * Represented the Acomb ward of York City Council, 19861996,  and the Acomb ward of City of York Council, 19952011    
 † Represented the Acomb ward of City of York Council, 19992011

Bishopthorpe ward
The parishes of Acaster Malbis and Bishopthorpe

 * Represented the Copmanthorpe ward of City of York Council, 19992003,  and the Bishopthorpe ward of City of York Council, 20072011

Clifton ward

 * Represented the Clifton ward of City of York Council, 20072011 
 † Represented the Bootham ward of York City Council, 19821996,  the Fishergate division of North Yorkshire County Council, 19851989,  the Bootham ward of City of York Council, 19952003,   and the Clifton ward of City of York Council, 20032011  
 ‡ Represented the Clifton ward of City of York Council, 20032011

Derwent ward
The parishes of Dunnington, Holtby, and Kexby

 * Represented the Derwent ward of City of York Council, 20072011

Dringhouses and Woodthorpe ward

 * Represented the Foxwood ward of York City Council, 19901996,  the Foxwood ward of City of York Council, 19952003,   and the Dringhouses and Woodthorpe ward of City of York Council, 20032011  
 † Represented the Dringhouses and Woodthorpe ward of City of York Council, 20032011

Fishergate ward

 * Represented the Fishergate ward of City of York Council, 20032011  
 † Represented the Fishergate ward of City of York Council, 20072011

Fulford ward
The parish of Fulford

 * Represented the Fulford ward of City of York Council, 20032011

Guildhall ward 

 * Represented the Guildhall division of North Yorkshire County Council, 19851996,  and the Guildhall ward of City of York Council, 19952011    
 † Represented the Acomb ward of York City Council, 19791984, the Guildhall ward of York City Council, 19881996,  the Acomb division of North Yorkshire County Council, 19811989,  and the Guildhall ward of City of York Council, 19952011

Haxby and Wigginton ward
The parishes of Haxby and Wigginton

 * Represented the Haxby and Wigginton ward of City of York Council, 20072011 
 † Represented the Strensall ward of City of York Council, 20032007

Heslington ward
The parish of Heslington

Heworth ward

 * Represented the Heworth ward of City of York Council, 20092011 
 † Represented the Beckfield ward of City of York Council, 19992003,  and the Heworth ward of City of York Council, 20032011  
 ‡ Represented the Heworth ward of City of York Council, 20072011

Heworth Without ward
The parish of Heworth Without

 * Represented the Heworth Without ward of City of York Council, 20072011 
Compared with 2007 results. The Liberal Democrats had previously gained this seat in a by-election in September 2007.

Holgate ward

 * Represented the Holgate ward of City of York Council, 20072011 
 † Represented the Holgate ward of City of York Council, 20032007

Hull Road ward

Huntington and New Earswick ward
The parishes of Huntington and New Earswick

 * Represented the Huntington and New Earswick ward of City of York Council, 20032011  
 † Represented the Huntington and New Earswick ward of City of York Council, 19992011

Micklegate ward

 * Represented the Micklegate ward of City of York Council, 20072011 
 † Represented the Micklegate ward of City of York Council, 20032011  
 ‡ Represented the Bishophill ward of York City Council, 19821996,  the Bishophill ward of City of York Council, 19952003,   and the Micklegate ward of City of York Council, 20032011

Osbaldwick ward
The parishes of Murton and Osbaldwick

 * Represented the Osbaldwick / Heworth division of North Yorkshire County Council, 19851996,  and the Osbaldwick ward of City of York Council, 19992011   
 † Represented the Fishergate division of North Yorkshire County Council, 19891993

Rural West York ward
The parishes of Askham Bryan, Askham Richard, Copmanthorpe, Hessay, Nether Poppleton, Rufforth with Knapton, and Upper Poppleton

 * Represented the Rural West York ward of City of York Council, 20072011 
 † Represented the Rural West York ward of City of York Council, 20032007 
 ‡ Represented the Upper Poppleton ward of City of York Council, 19952003,   and the Rural West York ward of City of York Council, 20032007

Skelton, Rawcliffe, and Clifton Without ward
The parishes of Clifton Without, Rawcliffe, and Skelton

 * Represented the Skelton, Rawcliffe, and Clifton Without ward of City of York Council, 20072011

Strensall ward
The parishes of Earswick, Stockton-on-the-Forest, and Strensall with Towthorpe

 * Represented the Strensall ward of City of York Council, 20072011 
 † Represented the Skelton ward of Ryedale District Council, 19911996,  and the Strensall ward of City of York Council, 19962011

Westfield ward

 * Represented the Westfield ward of York City Council, 19941996,   and the Westfield ward of City of York Council, 19992011   
 † Represented the Westfield ward of York City Council, 19791996,  the Westfield division of North Yorkshire County Council, 19931996,  and the Westfield ward of City of York Council, 19952011    
 ‡ Represented the Rawcliffe and Skelton ward of City of York Council, 19992003,  and the Skelton, Rawcliffe, and Clifton Without ward of City of York Council, 20032007

Wheldrake ward
The parishes of Deighton, Elvington, Naburn, and Wheldrake

 * Represented the Wheldrake ward of City of York Council, 20032011

References

2011 English local elections
2011
2010s in York